Holbrook Radar Bomb Scoring Site (call sign Holbrook Bomb Plot) is a Formerly Used Defense Site of  near Winslow, Arizona, that was used as a Cold War Strategic Air Command radar station for the Holbrook Radar Bomb Scoring Range.  Detachment 2 of the Radar Bomb Scoring Division transferred its personnel and equipment from the South Dakota Interior Radar Bomb Scoring Site (call sign Badlands Bomb Plot) Spring 1968.  The site had a housing area, and after the division became the 1st Electronic Combat Range Group (1ECRG), in August 1989 the detachment and site transferred from the 1ECRG to the 99th Strategic Weapons Wing.

In 1993, "part of Holbrook Radar Bomb Scoring Site [was] conveyed to the National Park Service" (Petrified Forest National Park).

References

Installations of the United States Air Force in Arizona
Military installations closed in 1993
1986 establishments in Arizona
1993 disestablishments in Arizona
History of Navajo County, Arizona